The Arrows A4 was the car which the Arrows Formula One team used to compete in the 1982 Formula One season.

Complete Formula One results
(key)

References

A04